Space Shuttle Enterprise (Orbiter Vehicle Designation: OV-101) was the first orbiter of the Space Shuttle system. Rolled out on September 17, 1976, it was built for NASA as part of the Space Shuttle program to perform atmospheric test flights after being launched from a modified Boeing 747. It was constructed without engines or a functional heat shield. As a result, it was not capable of spaceflight.

Originally, Enterprise had been intended to be refitted for orbital flight to become the second space-rated orbiter in service. Similarly, Enterprise was considered for refit to replace Challenger after the latter was destroyed, but  was built from structural spares instead.

Enterprise was restored and placed on display in 2003 at the Smithsonian's new Steven F. Udvar-Hazy Center in Virginia. Following the retirement of the Space Shuttle fleet,  replaced Enterprise at the Udvar-Hazy Center, and Enterprise was transferred to the Intrepid Sea, Air & Space Museum in New York City, where it has been on display since July 2012.

Differences between Enterprise and future shuttles
A large number of subsystems—ranging from main engines to radar equipment—were not installed on Enterprise, but the capacity to add them in the future was retained, as NASA originally intended to refit the orbiter for spaceflight at the conclusion of its testing. Instead of a thermal protection system, its surface was primarily covered with simulated tiles made from polyurethane foam. Fiberglass was used for the leading edge panels in place of the reinforced carbon–carbon ones of spaceflight-worthy orbiters. Only a few sample thermal tiles and some Nomex blankets were real. Enterprise used fuel cells to generate its electrical power, but these were not sufficient to power the orbiter for spaceflight.

Enterprise also lacked reaction control system thrusters and hydraulic mechanisms for the landing gear; the landing gear doors were simply opened through the use of explosive bolts and the gear dropped down solely by gravity. As it was only used for atmospheric testing, Enterprise featured a large nose probe mounted on its nose cap, common on test aircraft because the location provides the most accurate readings for the test instruments, being mounted out in front of the disturbed airflow.

Enterprise was equipped with Lockheed-manufactured zero-zero ejection seats like those its sister  carried on its first four missions.

Construction milestones

Service

Construction began on Enterprise on June 4, 1974. Designated OV-101, it was originally planned to be named Constitution and unveiled on Constitution Day, September 17, 1976. Fans of Star Trek asked US President Gerald Ford, through a letter-writing campaign, to name the orbiter after the television show's fictional starship, USS Enterprise. White House advisors cited "hundreds of thousands of letters" from Trekkies, "one of the most dedicated constituencies in the country", as a reason for giving the shuttle the name. Although Ford did not publicly mention the campaign, the president said that he was "partial to the name" Enterprise, and directed NASA officials to change the name.

In mid-1976 the orbiter was used for ground vibration tests, allowing engineers to compare data from an actual flight vehicle with theoretical models.

On September 17, 1976, Enterprise was rolled out of Rockwell's plant at Palmdale, California. In recognition of its fictional namesake, Star Trek creator Gene Roddenberry and most of the principal cast of the original series of Star Trek were on hand at the dedication ceremony.

Approach and landing tests (ALT)

On January 31, 1977, Enterprise was taken by road to Dryden Flight Research Center at Edwards Air Force Base to begin operational testing.

While at NASA Dryden Enterprise was used by NASA for a variety of ground and flight tests intended to validate aspects of the shuttle program. The initial nine-month testing period was referred to by the acronym ALT, for "Approach and Landing Test". These tests included a maiden "flight" on February 18, 1977, atop a Boeing 747 Shuttle Carrier Aircraft (SCA) to measure structural loads and ground handling and braking characteristics of the mated system. Ground tests of all orbiter subsystems were carried out to verify functionality prior to atmospheric flight.

The mated Enterprise/SCA combination was then subjected to five test flights with Enterprise uncrewed and unactivated. The purpose of these test flights was to measure the flight characteristics of the mated combination. These tests were followed with three test flights with Enterprise crewed to test the shuttle flight control systems.

On August 12, 1977, Enterprise flew on its own for the first time. Enterprise underwent four more free flights where the craft separated from the SCA and was landed under astronaut control. These tests verified the flight characteristics of the orbiter design and were carried out under several aerodynamic and weight configurations. The first three flights were flown with a tailcone placed at the end of Enterprise aft fuselage, which reduced drag and turbulence when mated to the SCA. The final two flights saw the tailcone removed and mockup main engines installed. On the fifth and final glider flight, pilot-induced oscillation problems were revealed, which had to be addressed before the first orbital launch occurred.

Mated Vertical Ground Vibration Test (MGVT)
Following the conclusion of the ALT test flight program, on March 13, 1978, Enterprise was flown once again, but this time halfway across the country to NASA's Marshall Space Flight Center (MSFC) in Alabama for the Mated Vertical Ground Vibration Testing (MGVT). The orbiter was lifted up on a sling very similar to the one used at Kennedy Space Center and placed inside the Dynamic Test Stand building, and mated to the Vertical Mate Ground Vibration Test tank (VMGVT-ET), which in turn was attached to a set of inert Solid Rocket Boosters (SRB) to form a complete shuttle launch stack, and marked the first time in the program's history that all Space Shuttle elements, an Orbiter, an External Tank (ET), and two SRBs, were mated together. During the course of the program, Enterprise and the rest of the launch stack would be exposed to a punishing series of vibration tests simulating as closely as possible those expected during various phases of launch, some tests with and others without the SRBs in place.

Planned preparations for spaceflight
At the conclusion of this testing, Enterprise was due to be taken back to Palmdale for retrofitting as a fully spaceflight capable vehicle. Under this arrangement, Enterprise would be launched on its maiden spaceflight in July 1981 to launch a communications satellite and retrieve the Long Duration Exposure Facility, then planned for a 1980 release on the first operational orbiter, Columbia. Afterward, Enterprise would conduct two Spacelab missions. However, in the period between the rollout of Enterprise and the rollout of Columbia, a number of significant design changes had taken place, particularly with regard to the weight of the fuselage and wings. This meant that retrofitting the prototype would have been a much more expensive process than previously realized, involving the dismantling of the orbiter and the return of various structural sections to subcontractors across the country. As a consequence, NASA made the decision to convert an incomplete Structural Test Article, numbered STA-099, which had been built to undergo a variety of stress tests, into a fully flight-worthy orbiter, which became .

Preparation for STS-1

Following the MGVT program and with the decision to not use Enterprise for orbital missions, it was ferried to Kennedy Space Center on April 10, 1979. By June 1979, it was again mated with an external tank and solid rocket boosters (known as a boilerplate configuration) and tested in a launch configuration at KSC Launch Complex 39A for a series of fit checks of the facilities there.

After this period, Enterprise was returned to NASA's Dryden Flight Research Facility in September 1981.  In 1983 and 1984, Enterprise underwent an international tour visiting France, West Germany, Italy, the United Kingdom, and Canada. Enterprise also visited California, Alabama, and Louisiana (while visiting the 1984 Louisiana World Exposition). It was also used to fit-check the never-used shuttle launch pad at Vandenberg AFB, California. On November 18, 1985, Enterprise was ferried to Washington, D.C., where it became property of the Smithsonian Institution and was stored in the National Air and Space Museum's hangar at Dulles International Airport.

Post-Challenger
After the Challenger disaster, NASA considered using Enterprise as a replacement.

Post-Columbia

In 2003 after the breakup of  during re-entry, the Columbia Accident Investigation Board conducted tests at Southwest Research Institute, which used an air cannon to shoot foam blocks of similar size, mass and speed to that which struck Columbia at a test structure which mechanically replicated the orbiter wing leading edge. They removed a section of fiberglass leading edge from Enterprise wing to perform analysis of the material and attached it to the test structure, then shot a foam block at it. Since the strength of the reinforced carbon–carbon (RCC) on Columbia is "substantially weaker and less flexible" than the test section from Enterprise, this result suggested that the RCC would have been shattered. A section of RCC leading edge from Discovery was tested on June 6, to determine the effects of the foam on a similarly aged leading edge, resulting in a  crack on panel 6 and cracking on a "T"-shaped seal between panels 6 and 7. The tests clearly demonstrated that a foam impact of the type Columbia sustained could seriously breach the protective RCC panels on the wing leading edge.

The board determined that the probable cause of the accident was that the foam impact caused a breach of a reinforced carbon-carbon panel along the leading edge of Columbia left wing, allowing hot gases generated during re-entry to enter the wing and cause structural collapse. This caused Columbia to tumble out of control, breaking up with the loss of the entire crew.

Museum exhibit

Washington, D.C.
From 1985 to 2003, Enterprise was stored at the Smithsonian's hangar at Washington Dulles International Airport before it was restored and moved to the Smithsonian's newly built National Air and Space Museum Steven F. Udvar-Hazy Center at Washington Dulles, where it was the centerpiece of the space collection. On April 12, 2011, NASA announced that , the most traveled orbiter in the fleet, would replace Enterprise in the Smithsonian's collection once the Shuttle fleet was retired, with ownership of Enterprise transferred to the Intrepid Sea, Air & Space Museum in New York City. On April 17, 2012, Discovery was transported by Shuttle Carrier Aircraft to Dulles from Kennedy Space Center, where it made several passes over the Washington D.C. metro area. After Discovery had been removed from the Shuttle Carrier Aircraft, both orbiters were displayed nose-to-nose outside the Steven F. Udvar-Hazy Center before Enterprise was made ready for its flight to New York.

New York

On December 12, 2011, ownership of Enterprise was officially transferred to the Intrepid Sea, Air & Space Museum in New York City. In preparation for the anticipated relocation, engineers evaluated the vehicle in early 2010 and determined that it was safe to fly on the Shuttle Carrier Aircraft once again. At approximately 13:40 UTC on April 27, 2012, Enterprise took off from Dulles International Airport en route to a fly-by over the Hudson River, New York's JFK International Airport, the Statue of Liberty, the George Washington and Verrazano-Narrows Bridges, and several other landmarks in the city, in an approximately 45-minute "final tour". At 15:23 UTC, Enterprise touched down at JFK International Airport.

The mobile Mate-Demate Device and cranes were transported from Dulles to the ramp at JFK and the shuttle was removed from the SCA overnight on May 12, 2012, placed on a specially designed flat bed trailer and returned to Hangar 12. On June 3 a Weeks Marine barge took Enterprise to Jersey City. The Shuttle sustained cosmetic damage to a wingtip when a gust of wind blew the barge towards a piling. It was hoisted June 6 onto the Intrepid Museum in Manhattan.

Enterprise went on public display on July 19, 2012, at the Intrepid Museum's new Space Shuttle Pavilion, a temporary shelter consisting of a pressurized, air-supported fabric bubble constructed on the aft end of the carrier's flight deck.

On October 29, 2012, storm surges from Hurricane Sandy caused Pier 86, including the Intrepid Museum's visitor center, to flood, and knocked out the museum's electrical power and both backup generators. The loss of power caused the Space Shuttle Pavilion to deflate, and high winds from the hurricane caused the fabric of the Pavilion to tear and collapse around the orbiter. Minor damage was spotted on the vertical stabilizer of the orbiter, as a portion of the tail fin above the rudder/speedbrake had broken off. The broken section was recovered by museum staff. While the pavilion itself could not be replaced for some time in 2013, the museum erected scaffolding and sheeting around Enterprise to protect it from the environment.

By April 2013, the damage sustained to Enterprise vertical stabilizer had been fully repaired, and construction work on the structure for a new pavilion was under way. The pavilion and exhibit reopened on July 10, 2013.

Enterprise was listed on the National Register of Historic Places on March 13, 2013, reference number 13000071, in recognition of its role in the development of the Space Shuttle Program. The historic significance criteria are in space exploration, transportation, and engineering.

Gallery

See also

Buran (spacecraft)
List of human spaceflights
List of Space Shuttle crews
List of Space Shuttle missions
National Register of Historic Places listings in Manhattan from 14th to 59th Streets
Space Shuttle Pathfinder
Timeline of Space Shuttle missions

References

Attribution

External links

Enterprise (OV-101)  at NASA.gov
Enterprise (OV-101) Approach and Landing Test (1977)

Articles containing video clips
Enterprise
Individual aircraft
Individual spacecraft in the collection of the Smithsonian Institution
National Register of Historic Places in Manhattan
Enterprise
Space Shuttle tourist attractions
Test spaceflights